The Almaden Open was a golf tournament that began at the Almaden Country Club in San Jose, California in 1958, mostly with local pros. It became a PGA Tour event, the Almaden Open Invitational, in 1961 and was played until 1965. After the 1965 event, the course underwent a major overhaul for several years. In 1968, a decision was made by the new owners not to continue the tournament.

Winners

Notes

References

Former PGA Tour events
Golf in California
Sports in San Jose, California
Recurring sporting events established in 1958
Recurring events disestablished in 1965
1958 establishments in California
1965 disestablishments in California